The German Imperial Navy (Kaiserliche Marine) created a series of fleet cruiser designs—designated Flottenkreuzer—in 1916 to follow the s ordered in 1915. They were initially intended to favor high speed for reconnaissance over the heavier gun armament of the Cöln class, though by the final iterations, they were as powerful as the earlier class. The design staff ultimately drew up five different designs: FK 1, FK 1a, FK 2, FK 3, and FK 4. Each proposed design grew in size over the preceding draft, as the weaponry and propulsion systems were increased. None of the designs were built, owing to shifting construction priorities in the German Navy in the last year of World War I.

FK 1 and FK 1a

The next design, under the provisional name FK 1, or Flottenkreuzer (Fleet cruiser), was prepared in 1916. The design, which emphasized the reconnaissance role and high speed over combat power, was based on the British s at the request of Kaiser Wilhelm II. A modified design, named FK 1a, was a slightly larger vessel.

The ship would have had a double bottom of approximately 52 percent of the length of the hull, and fifteen watertight compartments. The hull was constructed with longitudinal steel frames. The ship's hull would have been constructed as in FK 1, with the same number of watertight compartments and extent of double bottom.

FK 1 would have been equipped with five Marine-type oil-fired watertube boilers, while FK 1a would have had improved double-ended models. Both designs were equipped with three diesel generators that produced  at 220 volts. Steering was controlled by a single rudder.

The armament of both designs consisted of five 15 cm SK L/45 guns in single mounts, one forward, two abreast of the conning tower, and two in a superfiring pair aft of the rear superstructure. FK 1 and FK 1a were supplied with 500 and 650 shells for their main batteries, respectively. Both designs were equipped with a pair of 8.8 cm SK L/45 anti-aircraft guns, mounted on the centerline amidships. The guns were equipped with 100 rounds of ammunition each. These guns fired a  shells. Both ships would have carried four  torpedo tubes mounted on the deck in swivel launchers. FK 1a was also equipped with 100 mines. Both designs called for a crew of 15 officers and 342 enlisted men.

FK 2, FK 3, and FK 4

Over the course of the design process that continued through 1916, the size of the projected cruisers increased as the navy added new design requirements. This resulted in the FK 2 design. The FK 2 design was armed with five 15 cm SK L/45 guns and two 8.8 cm SK L/45 anti-aircraft guns. It was to carry the same 60 cm torpedo tubes in twin mounts as the earlier designs. The design retained the same propulsion system as the earlier designs, but with an improved engine type and an additional boiler, which produced an estimated  for a top speed of 32 knots. Range was to have been 2,800 miles at 17 knots, as in the original design.

The next iteration, FK 3, brought even more increases. Displacement rose to  normal and  full load, double that of the original FK design. The armament was also augmented by an additional two 15 cm and 1 8.8 cm gun. Since the size of the ship had increased, a more powerful propulsion system was necessary; a third set of turbines was added, and the number of boilers was increased to thirteen. This produced , for the same speed and range figures as in the previous designs.

The final design, FK 4, was larger still. The armament was increased again, with an additional 15 cm gun. The ship's propulsion system would have included six coal-fired boilers and nine oil-fired models.

Ultimately, none of these designs were ever built, much like other late-war German warship designs, such as the L 20e α-type battleships and the s. The German shipbuilding effort largely abandoned surface warship construction and instead focused on U-boat construction in the final years of the war.

Notes

References

Further reading

World War I cruisers of Germany
Cruiser classes
Proposed ships of Germany